Cedrick Tyrone Hordges (born January 8, 1957) is a retired American basketball player. He played in the National Basketball Association (NBA) as a member of the Denver Nuggets from 1980 to 1982. He was drafted by the Chicago Bulls during the third round of the 1979 NBA Draft from the University of South Carolina after transferring from Auburn University. He was then traded to the Nuggets, for whom he played in 145 games over 2 seasons.  He then continued his professional career in Europe, playing for 9 teams over 13 seasons.

External links

1957 births
Living people
American expatriate basketball people in Argentina
American expatriate basketball people in Italy
American expatriate basketball people in Spain
American men's basketball players
Auburn Tigers men's basketball players
Basketball players from Alabama
Chicago Bulls draft picks
Denver Nuggets players
Estudiantes de Bahía Blanca basketball players
Fortitudo Pallacanestro Bologna players
Libertas Liburnia Basket Livorno players
Liga ACB players
Nuova Pallacanestro Gorizia players
Pallacanestro Pavia players
Pallacanestro Varese players
Parade High School All-Americans (boys' basketball)
Power forwards (basketball)
South Carolina Gamecocks men's basketball players